Constance Willoughby (6 January 1930 – December 1997) was a British athlete. She competed in the women's long jump at the 1952 Summer Olympics.

References

1930 births
1997 deaths
Athletes (track and field) at the 1952 Summer Olympics
British female long jumpers
Olympic athletes of Great Britain
Place of birth missing